Peter Quanz (born August 22, 1979) is a Canadian choreographer based in Winnipeg, Manitoba.

Early life and education
Quanz was born in Baden, Ontario. He became interested in choreography as a child after his parents, both school teachers, enrolled him in ballet classes at the Academy of Dance in Waterloo, Ontario. Quanz attended the Integrated Arts Program at Eastwood Collegiate Institute for three years. He also attended the Banff Centre for the Arts in 1996 before attending the Royal Winnipeg Ballet School, from which he graduated in 1999. During his time in Winnipeg, Quanz was mentored by Arnold Spohr. Upon graduation, Quanz was awarded the Judy and Henny Jurriëns Choreographic Fellowship which afforded him a period to study ballet repertory, observing choreographers and companies in Europe.

Career
From 2000 to 2002 Quanz worked as a member of the Stuttgart Ballet. During this time, he was also supported by the Canada Council for the Arts and a Chalmers Performing Arts Grant.

Quanz began his choreographic career by creating pieces for young choreographers' evenings, such as Fast Forward (Royal Winnipeg Ballet), Noverre (Stuttgart Ballet), the New York Choreographic Institute (New York City Ballet), and Cascades (National Ballet of Canada). Quanz's pieces in these workshops attracted considerable attention from critics and helped Quanz launch his career.

In 2002, he was invited by the New York Choreographic Institute to choreograph a short work for the New York City Ballet.

In 2003, Quanz created SpringScape for the American Ballet Theatre Studio Company. Two years later, in March 2005, Quanz premiered his first full-length ballet, Charlie's Cruise, for Ballett Chemnitz, which drew positive reviews.  Later that year, Quanz was the recipient of the Clifford E. Lee Award, for which he created Quantz by Quanz, a piece that was reconceived in 2009 for the Royal Winnipeg Ballet. He also created Kaleidoscope, his first tutu ballet, for the American Ballet Theatre. This piece was reworked for Les Grands Ballets Canadiens in 2008. In 2007 Quanz was the first Canadian choreographer to create a ballet for the Kirov Ballet of the Mariinsky Theatre: Aria Suspended. The following year, Quanz was commissioned by Pennsylvania Ballet, creating Jupiter Symphony.

In 2009 a group of dancers from the Royal Winnipeg Ballet, working under Quanz's direction, performed his piece In Tandem, a work set to Steve Reich's Pulitzer Prize-winning score Double Sextet. In Tandem was commissioned by the Guggenheim Museum, Works & Process workshop. The success of this piece led Quanz to the form the ensemble Q Dance / Quanz Danse, which was launched in the spring of 2010.  Q Dance has performed at a number of dance festivals and since 2013, has been included in the Royal Winnipeg Ballet's seasons. His ballet In Tandem is also in the repertoire of the Royal Winnipeg Ballet.

Quanz continued the style he had used in In Tandem with his next piece Luminous, commissioned by Hong Kong Ballet and developed during Quanz's time with the National Choreographers Initiative. Quanz returned to his classical roots for the creation of Le Papillon, for the National Ballet of Cuba. It was a 90th birthday gift for Alicia Alonso.

In 2016, Quanz collaborated with Toronto choreographer Lucy Rupert to create dead reckoning, a three-part dance piece inspired by Ernest Shackleton's Antarctic expedition.  That year he was also the choreographer of the dance-drama The Red Crane, a production of the Wuxi Song and Dance Theatre from China, which also features Tristan Dobrowney of the Royal Winnipeg Ballet.

The archival records of Peter Quanz are housed at the Royal Winnipeg Ballet archives.

References

Canadian choreographers
1979 births
Living people
Ballet choreographers
People from the Regional Municipality of Waterloo